Arnold Williams (May 21, 1898 – May 25, 1970) was an American politician and businessman who served as the 21st governor of Idaho from 1945 until 1947. A member of the Democratic Party, he later served as Idaho's secretary of state from 1959 until 1966.

Early life and education
Born in Fillmore, Utah, Williams attended its public school and Henagers Business College in Salt Lake City.

Career
Williams served in the U.S. Army during World War I. Following his discharge, he established a successful dry cleaning business in Rexburg, Idaho. After serving in government at the local and county level, he was elected to the Idaho House in 1936 and served several terms.

Williams was elected lieutenant governor in 1944 and became governor in November 1945. He finished the unexpired term of Charles Gossett, who resigned after ten months and was immediately appointed by Williams to the U.S. Senate seat left vacant by the death of Republican John Thomas.

Williams became the state's first Mormon governor and was the Democratic nominee for governor in 1946, but was defeated in the general election by Republican C. A. Robins, a physician from St. Maries.
The first Mormon to be elected as Idaho's governor was incumbent Democrat John Evans in 1978.

Williams was a delegate to the Democratic National Convention from Idaho in 1948, and later was elected secretary of state of Idaho in 1958, and served until 1966.

Personal life 
Williams married Luella Huskinson and they had two children. He died at age 72 in Idaho Falls on May 25, 1970, and is interred at Fielding Memorial Park Cemetery in Idaho Falls.

References

External links
National Governors Association
The Political Graveyard

1898 births
1970 deaths
American Latter Day Saints
Democratic Party governors of Idaho
Lieutenant Governors of Idaho
Secretaries of State of Idaho
Democratic Party members of the Idaho House of Representatives
20th-century American politicians
People from Fillmore, Utah
United States Army personnel of World War I
United States Army soldiers